Scolodonta is a genus of air-breathing land snails, terrestrial pulmonate gastropod mollusks in the family Scolodontidae.

Scolodonta is the type genus of the family Scolodontidae.

This genus is sometimes classified within the Streptaxidae.

Distribution 
The distribution of the genus Scolodonta includes:
 Argentina
 Brazil

Description 
The anatomy of Scolodonta is currently unknown.

Species
Species within the genus Scolodonta include:
 Scolodonta amazonica (Dohrn, 1882)
 Scolodonta bounoboena (d’Orbigny, 1835)
 Scolodonta interrupta (Suter, 1900)
 Scolodonta mutata (Gould, 1846)
 Scolodonta nitidula (Dohrn, 1882)
 Scolodonta spirorbis (Deshayes, 1850)

References

Scolodontidae